C. Dean Andersson (March 20, 1946 - July 5, 2021) was an American writer of fantasy fiction and horror novels since 1981, both under his own name and under the pseudonym Asa Drake.

Biography 

Best known as a writer of fiction in the science fiction, fantasy, and horror genres.

Other work: television graphic artist, professional musician in United States Air Force bands, robotics computer programmer, and a technical writer specializing in software documentation for mainframe relational database management systems.

Born March 20, 1946, in the United States of America, state of Kansas, his childhood in Kansas served as a setting for the novel, Buried Screams, and for several scenes in the novel, Raw Pain Max.

A childhood encounter with Dracula in a small Kansas movie theater led to a fascination with the character and vampires in general that inspired research and spawned two novels, Crimson Kisses and I Am Dracula.
Having a Swedish-American father led to an interest in Scandinavian Mythology and Viking Age history, used for the Scandinavian Mythos Bloodsong Saga Warrior Witch of Hel, Death Riders of Hel, Werebeasts of Hel, and Valkyries of Hel (in-progress).

Familiarity with Dallas, Texas provided background for the Dallas Horror Trilogy, Torture Tomb, Raw Pain Max, and Fiend.
Childhood fear of Witches caused by Disney's Snow White and the Seven Dwarfs led to studies of historical Witchcraft persecutions, modern NeoPagan religions, and Goddess Spirituality that influenced thematic elements in many novels.

C. Dean Andersson is a veteran of the U.S. Air Force. He has a BS in Astrophysics and a BA in art. He is a member of the Science Fiction and Fantasy Writers of America and was a Bram Stoker Award nominee.

Prizes, honors, awards, tributes 

For academic achievement, elected to Sigma Pi Sigma (Physics Honor Society), Beta Gamma Sigma (Business Honor Society), Phi Kappa Phi (National Honor Society).
Horror Writers Association (HWA) Bram Stoker Award 2007 Short Fiction Finalist for "The Death Wagon Rolls on By," featuring a very close encounter with Hel, Norse Goddess of the Underworld.
"One Rode to Asa Bay," a song and music video from the Swedish Black Metal band Bathory's album, Hammerheart, was dedicated to Dean Andersson by Quorthon, Bathory's founder, as a tribute to Andersson's Scandinavian Mythos Bloodsong Saga, originally written under the pen name of "Asa Drake."

Illness and death 
Andersson died in his sleep July 5, 2021 at home in Richardson, Dallas TX after a long illness. He was 75.

Bibliography

Hel Trilogy aka Bloodsong Saga

As C. Dean Andersson: 
(definitive edition of whole trilogy, revised and expanded)
Bloodsong! HEL X 3 (2013) includes Warrior Witch of Hel, Death Riders of Hel, Werebeasts of Hel

As C. Dean Andersson:
(reprints of original trilogy)
Warrior Witch (2000), Russian language edition (2002)
Warrior Rebel (2000), Russian language edition (2002)
Warrior Beast (2000), Russian language edition (2002)

As Asa Drake: 
(original trilogy)
Warrior Witch of Hel (1985)
Death Riders of Hel (1986)
Werebeasts of Hel (1986)

Single novels

As C. Dean Andersson:
Torture Tomb (1987)
Raw Pain Max (1988)
Buried Screams (1992)
I Am Dracula (1993)
Fiend (1994)
I am Frankenstein (1996)
Note: 2 novels set in the Mortal Kombat universe were written but never released by the publisher (1996)

As Asa Drake:
Crimson Kisses (1981)
The Lair of Ancient Dreams (1982)

Short stories

As C. Dean Andersson
"Night Watch" in SCARE CARE (1989)
"Horror Heaven" in DARK SEDUCTIONS (1993)
"Small Brown Bags of Blood" in DARK DESTINY (1995)
"My Greatest Fear" in SONS OF DARKNESS (1996)
"Troll Story" in THE SPLENDOUR FALLS (1996)
"The Blood of Othinn" in DARK DESTINY III: CHILDREN OF DRACULA (1996)
"The War Skull of Hel" in PAWN OF CHAOS: TALES OF THE ETERNAL CHAMPION (1996)
"Barbed Wire Machete" in PERSONAL DEMONS
"Dust Bowl" in THE BOOK OF ALL FLESH (2001)
"Hang Tuff," "Daddy's Dinner," and "Odin's Swallow" in SMALL BITES (2004)
"The Tomb of Fog and Flowers" in THE MANY FACES OF VAN HELSING (2004)
"Slim and Swede and the Damned Dead Horse" in CROSS PLAINS UNIVERSE (2006)
"The Death Wagon Rolls On By" in CEMETERY DANCE #57 (2007)
"Mama Strangelove's Remedies for Afterlife Disorders or, How I Learned to Stop Worrying and Love Mother Death" in THE BRUTARIAN #52 (2008)
"The Testament of Tuff" in WHAT SCARES THE BOOGEY MAN? horror anthology edited by John Manning (Perseid Publishing, 2013)

References and sources

1946 births
2021 deaths
American male writers
Northern Arizona University alumni
University of North Texas alumni
People from Rice County, Kansas